Neurofibromin can refer to one of two different proteins:

 Neurofibromin 1
 Neurofibromin 2

See also
 Neurofibromatosis type I
 Neurofibromatosis type II

Proteins